Benjamin Lobo Vedel (born 23 September 1997) is a professional track and field sprinter specialising in the 400 metres and competes for Denmark. He currently trains in Aarhus, Denmark. He is the national record holder on both the 200m and 400m indoor.

Born in Aalborg, Denmark, Lobo Vedel won his first international medal at the European Youth Summer Olympic Festival in 2013 in a time of 48.37 on the 400m distance while also breaking his first national record. He went on to win the gold medal at the 2015 European Junior Championships and later took the bronze medal at the 2017 European U23 Championships respectively. In 2017 Lobo Vedel managed to place 4th at the European Indoor Championships in Belgrade Serbia as well, marking his debut as a senior.

Lobo Vedel turned to the United States in 2017 to continue his studies as well as his athletic career, as he committed to the Florida Gators. In his freshman year he managed to become a 2x All American, as well as winning a national NCAA team title indoors. He also anchored the third-fastest (3:01.43) 4x400 relay times in indoor track and field history. During his sophomore year, Lobo Vedel grabbed 3 more All American titles on the individual men's 400m and men's 4x400m, as well as another national team title. By the end of sophomore year, Lobo Vedel decided to return to Denmark to run professionally. As a result, he now competes for his hometown track club and Adidas.

His father, Anders Vedel, is a former middle-distance runner.

International competitions

1Did not start in the semifinal

Personal bests
Outdoor
100 metres – 10.73 (+0.9 m/s, Copenhagen 2016)
200 metres – 21.09 (+1.0 m/s, Tallahassee 2018)
400 metres – 45.85 (Bydgoszcz 2017)

Indoor
200 metres – 20.97 (Fayetteville 2019)
400 metres – 46.07 (Birmingham, AL 2019)

References

All-Athletics profile

1997 births
Living people
Danish male sprinters
Athletes (track and field) at the 2014 Summer Youth Olympics
Sportspeople from Aalborg
European Games competitors for Denmark
Athletes (track and field) at the 2019 European Games
Florida Gators men's track and field athletes